Kaltymanovo (Qaltıman) is a rural locality (a selo) and the administrative centre of Kaltymanovsky Selsoviet, Iglinsky District, Bashkortostan, Russia. The population was 530 as of 2010. There are 4 streets.

Geography 
Kaltymanovo is located 15 km south of Iglino (the district's administrative centre) by road. Novaya Beryozovka is the nearest rural locality.

References 

Rural localities in Iglinsky District